The discography of English post-punk band The Pop Group consists of four studio albums, two live albums, three compilation albums, six singles and four music videos.

Albums

Studio albums

Live albums

Compilation albums

Singles

Music videos

References

External links
 Official website
 The Pop Group at AllMusic
 
 

Discography
Discographies of British artists
Punk rock group discographies
Rock music group discographies